Vice Admiral Diego E. Hernandez (March 25, 1934 – July 7, 2017) was a United States Navy officer who was the first Hispanic American to be named Vice Commander, North American Aerospace Defense Command (NORAD).

Early years
Hernandez (birth name: Diego Hernandez Sanfeliz) was born on March 25, 1934 and raised in San Juan, Puerto Rico, the Capital of Puerto Rico, where he received his primary education. Upon his high school graduation, he was able to attend Illinois Institute of Technology with a Navy ROTC scholarship. In 1955, he earned a degree in Physics and was commissioned an Ensign in the United States Navy upon his graduation. He then underwent flight training and on August 1956, was designated a Naval Aviator.

Military career
Hernandez served in carrier-based fighter squadrons at sea in a variety of assignments. He flew two combat tours in Vietnam during the Vietnam War. He also served as Aide and Flag Lieutenant to Commander, Carrier Division 14. At sea, he was the commander of Fighter Squadron 84, Carrier Air Wing Six, and a fleet oiler (the ).

On June 27, 1980, Captain Diego E. Hernandez relieved outgoing Captain Myers and took command of the aircraft carrier . It was capable of anti-submarine warfare (ASW), making it an all-purpose carrier.

On September 19, 1980, Libyan Air Force planes engaged in an unprecedented number of sorties in the vicinity of USS John F. Kennedys Battle Group over international waters. F-14's under E-2 control intercepted two Libyan sections, and six and eighteen sections, respectively, on September 20 and 21.

On August 29, 1981, after a change of command ceremony, Captain D. Bruce Cargill relieved Captain Hernandez as commander of the USS John F. Kennedy. In 1988, Vice Admiral Diego E. Hernandez as Commander, Third Fleet, coordinated RIMPAC '88, a massive naval exercise which included more than 40 ships, approximately 200 aircraft and more than 50,000 sailors, airmen and Marines from the United States, Japan, Australia and Canada. This exercise marked the first inclusion of a battleship, USS Missouri, as a component in RIMPAC.

Vice Commander, North American Aerospace Defense Command
His last assignment on active duty was as Deputy Commander in Chief U.S. Space Command, dual hatted as Vice Commander, North American Aerospace Defense Command.

In 1987, Hernandez was presented with a Lifetime Achievement Award by the National Puerto Rican Coalition. In 1988, he was named the distinguished graduate of his class by Illinois Institute of Technology and presented with the institutions Professional Achievement Award. Hernandez, retired from the Navy in 1991, after having served for a total of 36 years.

Later years and death
Diego E. Hernandez resided in Miami, Florida. He served as management consultant to private and public companies. In 1997 he was named to the board of directors of the Taylor Energy Company LLC. He was also a member of the Veterans Administration Advisory Committee on Minority Veterans. Hernandez was also a Companion of the Naval Order of the United States, the oldest, exclusively naval, American military society. He died at the age of 83 on July 7, 2017.

Awards and decorations
Among Vice Admiral Diego E. Hernandez' decorations and medals were the following:
  Navy Distinguished Service Medal
  Silver Star
  Legion of Merit
  Distinguished Flying Cross
  Purple Heart
  Meritorious Service Medal with gold star
  Air Medal with a gold star
  Navy and Marine Corps Commendation Medal with two gold stars and a Combat "V" device
  Navy Unit Commendation with bronze star clasp
  Navy Meritorious Unit Commendation with bronze star clasp
  Navy Expeditionary Medal
  National Defense Service Medal
  Armed Forces Expeditionary Medal
  Vietnam Service Medal with four service stars
  Sea Service Deployment Ribbon
  Republic of Vietnam Gallantry Cross Unit Citation with Palm
  Vietnam Campaign MedalBadges:'''
  Naval Aviator Badge

See also

Hispanic Admirals in the United States Navy
List of Puerto Ricans
List of Puerto Rican military personnel

Notes

References

Further readingPuertorriquenos Who Served With Guts, Glory, and Honor. Fighting to Defend a Nation Not Completely Their Own''; by : Greg Boudonck;

External links
IIT Alumni 
  History of USS John F. Kennedy
USS Missouri Command History 
Hispanic Business
Early and Pioneer Naval Aviators Association

1934 births
2017 deaths
United States Navy personnel of the Vietnam War
Burials at Arlington National Cemetery
People from San Juan, Puerto Rico
Puerto Rican United States Navy personnel
United States Navy vice admirals
United States Naval Aviators
Recipients of the Legion of Merit
Recipients of the Silver Star
Recipients of the Navy Distinguished Service Medal
North American Aerospace Defense Command
Puerto Rican military officers
Illinois Institute of Technology alumni
Recipients of the Distinguished Flying Cross (United States)
Recipients of the Air Medal